In geometry, Archimedes' quadruplets are four congruent circles associated with an arbelos. Introduced by Frank Power in the summer of 1998, each have the same area as Archimedes' twin circles, making them Archimedean circles.

Construction

An arbelos is formed from three collinear points A, B, and C, by the three semicircles with diameters AB, AC, and BC. Let the two smaller circles have radii r1 and r2, from which it follows that the larger semicircle has radius r = r1+r2. Let the points D and E be the center and midpoint, respectively, of the semicircle with the radius r1. Let H be the midpoint of line AC. Then two of the four quadruplet circles are tangent to line HE at the point E, and are also tangent to the outer semicircle. The other two quadruplet circles are formed in a symmetric way from the semicircle with radius r2.

Proof of congruency

According to Proposition 5 of Archimedes' Book of Lemmas, the common radius of Archimedes' twin circles is:

By the Pythagorean theorem:

Then, create two circles with centers Ji perpendicular to HE, tangent to the large semicircle at point Li, tangent to point E, and with equal radii x. Using the Pythagorean theorem:

Also:

Combining these gives:

Expanding, collecting to one side, and factoring:

Solving for x:

Proving that each of the Archimedes' quadruplets' areas is equal to each of Archimedes' twin circles' areas.

References

More readings
 Arbelos: Book of Lemmas, Pappus Chain, Archimedean Circle, Archimedes' Quadruplets, Archimedes' Twin Circles, Bankoff Circle, S. 

Arbelos